The maximum safe storage temperature (MSST) is the highest temperature to store a chemical (like an organic peroxide) above which slow decomposition and explosion may occur.

References 

 

Chemical safety